"I Believe" is a song by American singer-songwriter Marcella Detroit, released on February 28, 1994, via London Records as the lead single from her second studio album, Jewel (1994). Written by Detroit and produced by Chris Thomas, the song went on to become Detroit's most successful single, peaking at number 11 in the United Kingdom, and achieved similar success internationally. Its highest peak on a national chart was in Australia, where it reached number 10.

German singer Joana Zimmer covered this song and released it as a single in 2005. Her version was more successful than Detroit's in German-speaking countries, reaching the top 10 in Austria and Germany and number 13 in Switzerland.

Critical reception
Aaron Badgley from AllMusic felt that songs like "I Believe" are "powerful songs, with great melodic hooks that stick after just one listening." Larry Flick from Billboard wrote, "Shakespear's Sister siren steps solo with an airy pop ballad that shows recently undisplayed vocal depth and power. Detroit can move mountains with a restrained whisper, and shatter glass with a rapturous bellow—both of which we get here. Fleshed-out, lush synths and plucky sitar riffs will remind some of Annie Lennox's Diva musings in the most positive way, while others will tap into the unique style that Detroit has developed. A multiformat smash is in the offing." In his review of Jewel, Johnny Huston from Entertainment Weekly said, "Marcella Detroit has a gift for perverse lyrics and a voice like Mariah Carey with a head cold, and she pouts and poses impressively in the role of tragic diva." Chuck Campbell from Knoxville News Sentinel felt the singer "grandstands in rather typical fashion on the love song". In his weekly UK chart commentary, James Masterton complimented it as a "gorgeous ballad". 

A reviewer from Music & Media commented, "'Hello, turn your radio on' because this solo debut of the American half out of Shakespears Sister is the perfect pop single. The intro is superb for talkative jocks, and so is the outro—if they can still find the words after the most stunning chorus in a long time." An editor, Robbert Tilli, wrote, "With "I Believe" Detroit delivered the "perfect pop single" with the right eyecatching artwork, showing her with a Philip Tracey-designed glove-shaped hat, as if the muse herself is putting her supportive hand on her head." Alan Jones from Music Week gave it four out of five and named it Pick of the Week, stating that Detroit makes her solo debut with "a stylish, self-penned swayer. After a low-key start, it builds admirably, and has an insidious chorus. Radio is already on board, and retail success is just a matter of time. Fab." Tom Doyle from Smash Hits gave the song three out of five, saying, "This is a properly played, properly sung, moody in the verses, rock belter in the choruses type of tune and it's all pleasant enough. Even if it does somehow remind you of that goldie oldie "China In Your Hand" by rock titans of yesteryear, T'Pau."

Music video
A black-and-white music video was made to accompany the song, directed by Big T.V. It features Skin from Skunk Anansie in a small role as a runner. The video depicts Detroit standing in a field, by some abandoned buildings where various people appears. She sings while she is looking up at a light that are shining down on her. As the video progress, people come running, surrounding the singer, and also they starts looking up in the sky. As more and more people joins the crowd, it gets larger and larger. It starts raining, and everybody leaves except for Detroit, who falls to her knees. As the video ends, the light is still shining down on her, through the rain.

Track listings
 US cassette single
 "I Believe" – 4:51
 "Shadow" – 3:43

 UK and Australian CD single
 "I Believe" – 4:50
 "Shadow" – 3:30
 "I Want to Take You Higher" – 3:29

 UK 7-inch and cassette single, European CD single
 "I Believe" – 4:50
 "I Want to Take You Higher" – 3:29

Charts

Weekly charts

Year-end charts

Certifications and sales

Joana Zimmer version

In 2005, German singer Joana Zimmer covered the song and released it as "I Believe (Give a Little Bit)" on Polydor Records as her debut single. In several territories, her single was more successful than the original, but in Sweden, it reached number 33 compared to Detroit's peak of number 18.

Track listing
 German CD single
 "I Believe" (radio edit) – 4:11
 "I Believe" (radio mix) – 3:51
 "Any Other Day" – 3:29
 "I Believe" – 4:33
 "I Believe" (instrumental) – 4:34

Charts

Weekly charts

Year-end charts

Certifications and sales

References

External links
 

1994 singles
1994 songs
2005 debut singles
Black-and-white music videos
Marcella Detroit songs
Music videos directed by Big T.V.
Song recordings produced by Chris Thomas (record producer)
Songs written by Marcella Detroit